Maji-Maji Football Club is a football club based in Songea, Ruvuma Region, Tanzania. They play at the 30,000-capacity Maji-Maji Stadium.

History 
The club was founded in 1978.
They play in the Tanzanian Premier League.

Achievements
Tanzanian Premier League: 3

 1985, 1986, 1998

Current squad

References

External links 

 Maji Maji FC at Soccerway

Football clubs in Tanzania